Katherine Kersten is a conservative columnist who wrote for the Minneapolis Star Tribune.

Background

Kersten, a graduate of Notre Dame and Yale universities, began her career as a financial analyst for a Chicago bank. Subsequently, she worked as a budget planner for the University of Wisconsin-Madison. After moving to the Twin Cities, she studied at and graduated from University of Minnesota Law School and began practicing law in Minnesota. After the second of her four children was born in 1985, she quit this job to become an opinion writer and commentator. She was a founding member of the think tank Center of the American Experiment and has written for publications such as Christianity Today and the Wall Street Journal.

Kersten worked for the Minneapolis Star Tribune as a columnist.

Views

Kersten has criticized the University of Minnesota and other institutes of higher learning for having what she perceives to be a liberal bias. She is a supporter of ROTC programs at the U of M. Before it closed in 2011, she was a strong critic of Tarek ibn Ziyad Academy, which she argued is a religious Muslim school which should not have been funded with taxpayer dollars.

Kersten opposes gay marriage, which she has likened to a "perilous, slippery slope". She argues that "the primary purpose of marriage is to ensure the best environment for rearing the children born of male-female sexual acts" and that legalization of gay marriage may eventually lead to the legalization of polygamy as well. She also opposes affirmative action for racial minorities and compared President Clinton's handling of the issue to "the Phil Donohue school of policy making. It may make us feel good about ourselves, but it's unlikely to make much of a dent in the problems we face."

She has identified herself as a conservative feminist, arguing that women have suffered injustice and still do, that the solution rests on Western culture, and that the sexes must be equal although she also argues that perfection is humanly unattainable.

Kersten has criticized Representative Keith Ellison's calls for a United States Department of Peace, arguing that the idea is unrealistic in a violent world.

She has a very positive view of Wal-Mart and its impact on society, defending it against critics who argue that it hurts small business.

See also

References

American opinion journalists
American columnists
University of Minnesota Law School alumni
Living people
Year of birth missing (living people)